Harold Crossthwaite (9 September 1890 – 1939) was an English footballer who played in the Football League for Stockport County and Stoke. His nephew Bert was also a footballer.

Career
Crossthwaite was born in Stockport and played amateur football with Heywood United before he joined local League side Stockport County in 1912. County struggled in the Second Division up until World War I broke out. Crossthwaite continued to play for the club during the war and back in 1919 once League football and been resumed. There was no change in the "Hatters" fortunes on the pitch and with the side languishing in the lower reaches of the table he signed for divisional rivals Stoke in March 1920. He made his debut for Stoke in the first league Potteries derby match against Port Vale and assisted goalscorer Arthur Watkin as Stoke won 3–0 at Vale's Old Recreation Ground. However Stoke had a disappointing end to the 1919–20 season and finished in mid-table. Crossthwaite started the 1920–21 as first choice right winger playing in 19 matches but after a poor performance against Birmingham he was dropped and at the end of the season he was sold back to Stockport County. In his first season back at Edgeley Park he helped Stockport to win the Football League Third Division North title. He spent one more season at Stockport before ending his career with Stalybridge Celtic.

Career statistics
Source:

Honours
 Stockport County
 Football League Third Division North champions: 1921–22

References

1890 births
1939 deaths
People from Stockport
Association football outside forwards
English footballers
Heywood United F.C. players
Stockport County F.C. players
Stoke City F.C. players
Stalybridge Celtic F.C. players
English Football League players